Equatorial Guinea first participated at the Olympic Games in 1984, and has sent athletes to compete in every Summer Olympic Games since then.  The nation has never participated in the Winter Olympic Games.

As of 2016, no athlete from Equatorial Guinea has ever won an Olympic medal.  The nation's most famous Olympic athlete is Eric Moussambani, who achieved some international notoriety for his exceptionally slow performance in swimming at the 2000 Summer Olympics.

The National Olympic Committee for Equatorial Guinea was created in 1980 and recognized by the International Olympic Committee in 1984.

Medal tables

Medals by Summer Games

See also
 List of flag bearers for Equatorial Guinea at the Olympics
 :Category:Olympic competitors for Equatorial Guinea

External links
 
 
 

 
Olympics